The 1986–87 Football League season was Birmingham City Football Club's 84th in the Football League and their 34th in the Second Division, to which they were relegated in 1985–86. They finished in 19th position in the 22-team division, and avoided a second successive relegation only by two points. They entered the 1986–87 FA Cup in the third round proper and lost to Walsall in the fourth, and were eliminated from the League Cup in the third round by Tottenham Hotspur. They entered the second season of the Full Members' Cup, a competition created for teams in the top two divisions after English clubs were banned from UEFA competitions following the Heysel disaster, and lost in the second round away to Charlton Athletic in front of a crowd of only 821.

The top scorer was Wayne Clarke with 19 goals, of which 16 were scored in league matches. The average attendance, of under 7,500, was a record low for a season at St Andrew's.

Football League Second Division

League table (part)

FA Cup

League Cup

Full Members' Cup

Appearances and goals

Numbers in parentheses denote appearances as substitute.
Players with name struck through and marked  left the club during the playing season.
Players with names in italics and marked * were on loan from another club for the whole of their season with Birmingham.

See also
Birmingham City F.C. seasons

References
General
 
 
 Source for match dates, league positions and results: 
 Source for lineups, appearances, goalscorers and attendances: Matthews (2010), Complete Record, pp. 408–09, 419.

Specific

Birmingham City F.C. seasons
Birmingham City